Tateoka may refer to:
 Soichiro Tateoka (born 1990), a Japanese  baseball player
 Tateoka Doshun (Sengoku Period), an intermediate-ranking Iga ninja